The Players Champions Cup is the trophy awarding to the winner of a hurling competition held periodically in the United States. It has been staged three times as the Fenway Hurling Classic in Boston, Massachusetts, and once as the New York Hurling Classic in Queens, New York. The first two editions were sponsored by AIG, while the most recent editions have been sponsored by Aer Lingus.

Format
Matches are played in the Super 11’s format, which only permits goals to be scored, not points. Goals scored inside the  exclusion zone are worth three points, else five points from outside. The 2015 event was a single match, divided into four 15-minute quarters with unlimited substitutions. Later events have had two semi-final matches then a final match, all held on the same day, with matches divided into two 20-minutes halves. Yellow cards result in a two-minute spell in the sin bin and frees are taken on a tap-and-go basis. A team has 30 seconds after gaining possession to attempt a shot at goal. This is reduced to 20 seconds in the final two minutes of each period. The dimensions of the pitch are  x —the size of a gridiron football pitch, without the end zones—which is laid into halves, with a defensive zone marked by a line drawn  from each goal line.

Results

2015
This was the first time that hurling was played at Fenway Park since November 1954, when Cork defeated an American team. With Galway facing Dublin in the event's only match, the contest was marred by a brawl in the second quarter in front of the Dublin goal. A bout of pushing and shoving quickly started with players throwing punches, wrestling on the ground. Galway's Iarla Tannian and Andy Smith along with Dublin's Conor Dooley were all yellow-carded. Each side was later fined €5,000 by the Central Competitions Control Committee of the GAA.

2017
The 2017 competition took place on 19 November at Fenway Park and was a doubleheader with Dublin playing Galway and Tipperary playing Clare in the Super 11's format. The winners of the two semi-finals played in the final for the Players Championship Cup.	
Clare defeated Galway in the final 50–33 to win the Players Champions Cup.

2018
The 2018 competition took place at Fenway Park on 18 November and was a doubleheader with Cork playing Clare and Limerick playing Wexford in the Super 11's format. The winners of the two semi-finals played in the final for the Players Championship Cup, with Limerick defeating Cork.

2019
The 2019 competition was held at Citi Field in Queens on 16 November. In first-round games, defending champion Limerick defeated Wexford, and event newcomer Kilkenny defeated Tipperary. In the final, Kilkenny took a 34–22 halftime lead over Limerick, and continued on to a 64–40 win.

Appearances
Includes all matches played through the 2019 event.

Championship years are denoted by bold type.

References

Further reading

External links
 Photo of the Players Champions Cup via Twitter
 Dublin Vs. Galway AIG Fenway Hurling Classic - Complete Match from NESN via YouTube
 2017 Fenway Hurling Classic from NESN via YouTube

2015 in hurling
2017 in hurling
2018 in hurling
2019 in hurling
Hurling competitions in Massachusetts
Hurling competitions in New York (state)
Senior inter-county hurling competitions
Sports competitions in Boston
Sports competitions in New York City
Sports in Queens, New York